Heretic Films is an American film production company, based in the mountain resort town of Park City, Utah. Heretic is known for working with artists, both new and established, on their passion projects.

History 
Films was founded in 2012 by Burton Ritchie and Ben Galecki after a short, initial incarnation as Rather Good Film, co-founded with Daniel-Konrad Cooper. Shortly after its transition to Heretic Films, Gregory Segal joined the company along with board members Kevin Pollak and Jason Alexander.  Segal left the company in October 2015.

In 2014, Heretic Films ran a successful Kickstarter campaign for the documentary Misery Loves Comedy. Misery went on to premier as a 2015 Sundance Film Festival special event and was subsequently acquired by Tribeca Film.

On July 3, 2019, founders Charles Burton Ritchie and Benjamin Gelecki were found guilty of 24 federal charges related to another synthetic drug case in Nevada, after their Virginia case was overturned.

The pair was held responsible for selling 4,000 pounds, which grossed $1.6 million, of Spice/K2 within a 24-day period in 2012.

Sentencing is scheduled for January 10, 2020 in federal court

Filmography

Awards

References

External links
 Heretic Films
 Heretic Films - IMDb

Film distributors of the United States
Film production companies of the United States